Alexander Hutchison may refer to:

 Alexander Hutchison (1943–2015), Scottish poet
 Alexander Hutchison (1838–1917), Australian politician, member of the New South Wales Legislative Assembly for Canterbury 1887–1891
 Alexander Hutchison (1838–1908), Australian politician, member of the New South Wales Legislative Assembly for Glen Innes 1889–1894
 Alexander Copland Hutchison FRSE (1786-1840) British surgeon
 Alexander Richard Hamilton Hutchison (1871–1930), British general
 Alex Hutchison (1864–1928), Scottish trade union leader

See also
 Alexander Hutchinson (disambiguation)